The 2014 Asian Men's Volleyball Cup, so-called 2014 AVC Cup for Men was the fourth edition of the AVC Cup for Men, played by top eight teams of the 2013 Asian Championship. The tournament was held at Baluan Sholak Sports Palace, Almaty, Kazakhstan from 18 to 24 August 2014.

Pools composition
The teams are qualified based on their final ranking at the 2013 Asian Men's Volleyball Championship. Seeding is in accordance with the final ranking of 2012 Asian Men's Cup Volleyball Championship.

Venue
 Baluan Sholak Sports Palace, Almaty, Kazakhstan

Preliminary round
All times are Almaty Time (UTC+06:00).

Pool A

Pool B

Final round
All times are Almaty Time (UTC+06:00).

Quarterfinals

5th–8th semifinals

Semifinals

7th place match

5th place match

3rd place match

Final

Final standing

Awards

Most Valuable Player
 Seo Jae-duck
Best Setter
 Han Sun-soo
Best Outside Spikers
 Sinnadhu Prabagaran
 Saeid Shiroud
Best Middle Blockers
 G. R. Vaishnav
 Mostafa Sharifat
Best Opposite Spiker
 Seo Jae-duck
Best Libero
 Kairat Baibekov

References

External links

Asian Volleyball Confederation

Asian Men's Volleyball Cup
AVC Cup
V
V